The  (Association for the German Language), or , is Germany's most important government-sponsored language society. Its headquarters are in Wiesbaden. Its aim is to research and cultivate the German language; to critically evaluate the current German language change; and to give recommendations concerning the current usage of German.

Activities 
With its language advice service, the  supports individuals, companies, authorities and institutions concerning questions of the usage of contemporary German with regard to spelling, grammar and style. 

In a bi-annual public ceremony, the  awards the Media Award for Language Culture. Furthermore, and in co-operation with the Alexander Rhomberg Foundation, the  awards the annual Alexander Rhomberg Award for young journalists.

Since 1971, the  produces the annual language retrospective, well known for its Word of the Year.

The  has a podcast called "Wortcast"  and has also been featured on other national and international podcasts such as "Yellow of the Egg"  and "Nah am Menschen".

Work for the German Parliament 
The  editorial panel of the parliament gives linguistic advice to both the Federal Council and the Federal parliament . They also advise ministries and authorities on both federal and state level as regards the linguistic correctness of draft legislation, by-laws, orders and other texts.

The most important task of the GfdS is to revise the language of draft legislation, by-laws and orders whose legal terminology must be formulated clearly and concisely.

Publications 

The publication mainly focuses on historical linguistics, grammar, stylistics, phraseology, terminology, onomastics and spelling, but also contains articles dealing with more general questions concerning the use of current German.

The 's highly regarded quarterly academic journal ,  in its 122nd year of publication with a circulation of 1,000 covering over 40 countries, focuses entirely on specialist linguistic matters.

Organisation 
The chairman of the GfdS is Armin Burkhardt, a professional linguist and Professor of Germanic Linguistics at Otto-von-Guericke University Magdeburg; the GfdS Secretary is Andrea-Eva Ewels, also a professional linguist.

, the association consists of a 103 branches in 35 countries on four continents, 47 in Germany and 56 abroad.

German branches 
, 50  branches are located in Germany, with at least one branch in each of the 16 German federal states:

 Baden-Württemberg (Freiburg, Heidelberg, Karlsruhe, Stuttgart)
 Bavaria (Munich, Nuremberg, Würzburg)
 Berlin (Berlin)
 Brandenburg (Frankfurt/Oder, Potsdam)
 Bremen (Bremen)
 Hamburg  (Hamburg)
 Hesse (Bergstraße, Darmstadt, Frankfurt am Main, Kassel, Marburg an der Lahn, Wiesbaden)
 Lower Saxony (Brunswick, Celle, Fechta, Göttingen, Hannover)
 Mecklenburg-Vorpommern (Greifswald, Rostock, Schwerin)
 North Rhine-Westphalia (Aachen, Bonn, Dortmund, Düsseldorf, Duisburg, Münsterland, Siegen, West Ruhr Area, Wuppertal)
 Rhineland-Palatinate (Koblenz, Mainz, Palatinate, Trier)
 Saxony (Chemnitz, Dresden, Leipzig, Zittau, Zwickau)
 Saxony-Anhalt (Halle/Saale, Magdeburg)
 Saarland (Saarbrücken)
 Schleswig-Holstein (Kiel)
 Thuringia (Erfurt, Weimar)

If a federal state has more than one branch, then at least one branch is located in the capital of the state.

Branches outside Germany 
, the  has 59 branches outside Germany, in 38 countries on four continents:

 Africa (6 branches)
 Egypt (Cairo)
 Cameroon (Yaoundé)
 Namibia (Windhoek)
 South Africa (Johannesburg, Cape Town)
 Togo (Lomé)	
 America (7 branches)
 Brazil (Porto Alegre, São Paulo)
 USA (Boston, Chicago, Madison, New York, Philadelphia)
 Asia (11 branches)
 Armenia (Yerevan)
 China (Hangzhou, Beijing, Shanghai)
 India (Pune)
 Israel (Tel Aviv)
 Japan (Tokyo)
 Russia (Omsk, Ural)
 South Korea (Seoul)
 Turkey (Ankara)
 Europe (35 branches)
 Austria (Innsbruck, Vienna)
 Belgium (Brussels)
 Bulgaria (Sofia)
 Croatia (Zagreb)	
 Czech Republic (Prague)
 Denmark (Copenhagen)
 Estonia (Tallinn)
 Finland (Turku, Vaasa)
 France (Paris)	
 Georgia (Tbilisi)
 Greece (Athens)
 Hungary (Budapest)
 Italy (Bolzano, Milan, Rome)
 Lithuania (Vilnius)
 Luxembourg (Luxembourg)
 Netherlands (Nijmegen)
 Poland (Warsaw, Wrocław)
 Romania (Bucharest)
 Russia (Kaliningrad, Moscow, Nizhny Novgorod, Polar Region, Saratow, St Petersburg, Voronezh)
 Slovakia (Bratislava)
 Spain (Madrid)
 Ukraine (Kiev, Chernivtsi)
 United Kingdom (London)

Co-operation 

The  is connected to various universities and other education institutions with an interest in linguistics, e.g. the German Academy for Language and Poetry and the Institute of the German Language (IDS).

References

External links 
 Homepage of the GfdS – Gesellschaft für deutsche Sprache
 List of GfdS branches
 GfdS UK

Language regulators
Organizations established in 1947
German language
Culture in Wiesbaden
1947 establishments in Germany